Albert Ntabaliba is a Tanzanian CCM politician and Member of Parliament for Manyovu constituency since 2010.

References

Living people
Chama Cha Mapinduzi MPs
Tanzanian MPs 2010–2015
Year of birth missing (living people)